Julius Edward Yankowsky (born August 8, 1938) is a former politician from Alberta, Canada. He served in the Legislative Assembly of Alberta from 1993 to 2004.

Political career
Yankowsky first ran for the Alberta Legislature in the 1993 general election, in the electoral district of Edmonton-Beverly-Belmont for the Liberal Party. He defeated incumbent New Democrat MLA Ed Ewasiuk. A year into his first term in office Yankowsky crossed the floor to the Progressive Conservative Party.  In the 1997 general election he was re-elected in the new electoral district of Edmonton Beverly-Clareview. In the 2001 general election he was re-elected with a comfortable plurality over five other candidates. In the 2004 Alberta general election he was defeated by former NDP Leader Ray Martin.

On June 1, 2006 Yankowsky was appointed to the board of directors of the newly formed Alberta Association of Former MLAs.

References

External links
Legislative Assembly of Alberta Members Listing

1938 births
Living people
Alberta Liberal Party MLAs
People from Lamont, Alberta
Politicians from Edmonton
Progressive Conservative Association of Alberta MLAs
21st-century Canadian politicians